Year 800 was a leap year starting on Wednesday of the Julian calendar.

800 may also refer to:
800 (number), the number
800 BC, a year
The original toll-free area code for telephone calls in the North American Numbering Plan and some other countries
The international direct dial code for toll-free international phone calls
ISO 800, a common film speed for photographic films
800 AM, an AM radio station frequency
TWA Flight 800, the flight number of an airplane disaster
The Atari 800 home computer
A perfect score on an individual section of the SAT test or on one of the SAT Subject Tests
800 metres, the name and distance in metres of an athletic event
Hawker 800, a British aircraft
Rover 800, a British automobile
 "800", a song by Saliva from their album Saliva (album) 
Nokia Lumia 800, a smartphone running Windows Phone operating system

See also
The Eight Hundred